The Journal of Medical Microbiology is a monthly peer-reviewed medical journal covering all aspects of microbiology relevant to human and animal disease, including pathogenicity, virulence, host response, epidemiology, microbial ecology, diagnostics, etc., relating to viruses, bacteria, fungi, and eukaryotic parasites. It is published by the Microbiology Society and the editors-in-chief are Norman Fry (Public Health England) and Kalai Mathee (Florida International University). The journal publishes primary research articles, reviews, short communications, personal views, and editorials.

History
The journal was established in 1968 and published by the Pathological Society of Great Britain and Ireland in conjunction with Lippincott Williams & Wilkins until 2001. From 1982 until 2002, the editor-in-chief was Brian Duerden.

Abstracting and indexing
The journal is abstracted and indexed in:

According to the Journal Citation Reports, the journal has a 2019 impact factor of 2.156.

References

External links

Microbiology journals
Delayed open access journals
Publications established in 1968
English-language journals
Monthly journals
Microbiology Society academic journals